The Lafourche Parish Courthouse is a historic building located at 200 Green Street in Thibodaux, Louisiana. It serves as the courthouse for Lafourche Parish, Louisiana. 

Built in 1858, the structure was "remodeled" in 1903 and 1959. It was designed in the Beaux-Arts architectural style by New Orleans architects Favrot & Livaudais. 

It has been listed on the National Register of Historic Places since August 21, 1979.

See also
 National Register of Historic Places listings in Lafourche Parish, Louisiana

References

	
National Register of Historic Places in Lafourche Parish, Louisiana
Beaux-Arts architecture in Louisiana
Government buildings completed in 1858
Buildings and structures in Lafourche Parish, Louisiana
Thibodaux, Louisiana